Koyambedu Metro station is a Metro railway station on the Line 2 of the Chennai Metro, which is one terminal of the current open metro line from St Thomas Mount. The station is among the elevated stations along corridor II of the Chennai Metro, Chennai Central–St. Thomas Mount stretch. The station will serve the neighbourhoods of Koyambedu, Koyambedu vegetable market, and Koyambedu Private Bus Terminus.

Construction history
The station was constructed by Consolidated Constructed Consortium (CCCL). The station attained structural completion in December 2012. The consolidated cost of the station along with the stations of Arumbakkam, CMBT, Vadapalani and Ashok Nagar was  1,395.4 million.

The station
This is an elevated station near Koyambedu vegetable market. The station will be able to handle about 23,000 passengers an hour. Elevation of the platforms will be about 15 m from the ground level and the total length of the platforms will be 140 m.

Layout

Facilities
List of available ATM at Koyambedu metro station are

Supportive infrastructure
Along with Chennai Central and Alandur stations, the station will have a 230-kV receiving sub-station for power supply from the state's electricity grid. The sub-station will supply 25-kV of electricity to the trains and 33-kV to the stations.

Along with Ashok Nagar and Vadapalani Metro stations, Koyambedu Metro station will be developed by leasing out space either for shops or office spaces. As part of fire safety measures, underground water tanks of 50,000 to 100,000 litre capacity will be set up at the station.

The station lies within 1 km from the Koyambedu Junction. The highways department has proposed a 1-km flyover that passes through Jawaharlal Nehru Road–Kaliamman Koil Street Junction. A skywalk has also been planned near the station across the Ponamallee High Road. The skywalk will link Rohini theatre with the Koyambedu Metro station.

Connections

Entry/Exit

See also

References

External links
 

 UrbanRail.Net – descriptions of all metro systems in the world, each with a schematic map showing all stations.

Chennai Metro stations
Railway stations in Chennai